The Sarah Records' catalogue consists of around a hundred items, each of which has a catalogue number. The items from Sarah 001 to Sarah 100 are mostly 7 inch singles. Exceptions are:
Sarah 3, 70 which are flexi discs
Sarah 4, 14, 32 and 70, which are fanzines
Sarah 38, a 10" EP
Sarah 50, a board game
Sarah 42 and 57, 12" singles
Sarah 100, the There And Back Again Lane compilation (a CD album).

Some of the 7" singles were additionally available on CD. There are also seven 10 inch albums (Sarah 401 to 407) and 22 LPs (Sarah 601 to 622), some or all of which were also released on compact disc.

Seven inch singles and fanzines
 Sarah 001 The Sea Urchins, "Pristine Christine", 1987
 Sarah 002 The Orchids, "I've Got A Habit", 1988
 Sarah 003 Another Sunny Day, "Anorak City", 1988
 Sarah 004 untitled fanzine, 1988
 Sarah 005 14 Iced Bears, "Come Get Me", 1988
 Sarah 006 The Poppyheads, "Cremation Town", 1988
 Sarah 007 Another Sunny Day, "I'm In Love With A Girl Who Doesn't Know I Exist", 1988
 Sarah 008 The Sea Urchins, "Solace", 1988
 Sarah 009 The Golden Dawn, "My Secret World", 1988
 Sarah 010 The Springfields, "Sunflower", 1988
 Sarah 011 The Orchids, "Underneath The Window, Underneath The Sink", 1988
 Sarah 012 The Field Mice, "Emma's House", 1988
 Sarah 013 Christine's Cat, "Your Love Is...", 1989
 Sarah 014 "lemonade" / "cold - a lie" (fanzines), 1989
 Sarah 015 St. Christopher, "You Deserve More Than A Maybe", 1989
 Sarah 016 Another Sunny Day, "What's Happened", 1989
 Sarah 017 The Golden Dawn, "George Hamilton's Dead", 1989
 Sarah 018 The Field Mice, "Sensitive", 1989
 Sarah 019 Brighter, "Around The World In Eighty Days", 1989
 Sarah 020 St. Christopher, "All Of A Tremble", 1989
 Sarah 021 The Wake, "Crush The Flowers", 1989
 Sarah 022 Another Sunny Day, "You Should All Be Murdered", 1989
 Sarah 023 The Orchids, "What Will We Do Next", 1989
 Sarah 024 The Field Mice, "The Autumn Store part 1", 1990
 Sarah 025 The Field Mice, "The Autumn Store part 2", 1990
 Sarah 026 Gentle Despite, "Darkest Blue", 1990
 Sarah 027 Brighter, "Noah's Ark", 1990
 Sarah 028 Action Painting!, "These Things Happen", 1990
 Sarah 029 The Orchids, "Something For The Longing", 1990
 Sarah 030 Heavenly, "I Fell In Love Last Night", 1990
 Sarah 031 Eternal, "Breathe", 1990
 Sarah 032 "Sunstroke" (fanzine), 1990
 Sarah 033 The Sea Urchins, "A Morning Odyssey", 1990
 Sarah 034 St. Christopher, "Antoinette", 1990
 Sarah 035 Another Sunny Day, "Rio", 1990
 Sarah 036 The Sweetest Ache, "If I Could Shine", 1990
 Sarah 037 Even As We Speak, "Nothing Ever Happens", 1990
 Sarah 038 The Field Mice, "So Said Kay", 1990
 Sarah 039 The Sweetest Ache, "Tell Me How It Feels", 1990
 Sarah 040 The Springfields, "Wonder", 1991
 Sarah 041 Heavenly, "Our Love Is Heavenly", 1991
 Sarah 042 The Orchids, "Penetration", 1991
 Sarah 043 Tramway, "Maritime City", 1991
 Sarah 044 The Field Mice, "September's Not So Far Away", 1991
 Sarah 045 Gentle Despite, "Torment To Me", 1991
 Sarah 046 St. Christopher, "Say Yes To Everything", 1991
 Sarah 047 The Sweetest Ache, "Sickening", 1991
 Sarah 048 The Wake, "Major John", 1991
 Sarah 049 Even As We Speak, "One Step Forward", 1991
 Sarah 050 "Saropoly" (fanzine/board game), 1991
 Sarah 051 Heavenly, "So Little Deserve", 1991
 Sarah 052 Tramway, "Sweet Chariot", 1991
 Sarah 053 Secret Shine, "After Years", 1991
 Sarah 054 Forever People, "Invisible", 1992
 Sarah 055 Blueboy, "Clearer", 1991
 Sarah 056 Brighter, "Half-Hearted", 1991
 Sarah 057 The Field Mice, "Missing The Moon", 1991
 Sarah 058 The Hit Parade, "In Gunnersbury Park", 1991
 Sarah 059 Even As We Speak, "Beautiful Day", 1992
 Sarah 060 Another Sunny Day, "New Year's Honours", 1992
 Sarah 061 Secret Shine, "Ephemeral", 1992
 Sarah 062 The Rosaries, "Forever EP", 1992
 Sarah 063 The Sugargliders, "Letter From A Lifeboat", 1992
 Sarah 064 Harvest Ministers, "You Do My World A World Of Good", 1992
 Sarah 065 Blueboy, "Popkiss", 1992
 Sarah 066 The Orchids, "Thaumaturgy", 1992
 Sarah 067 The Sugargliders, "Seventeen", 1992
 Sarah 068 Harvest Ministers, "Six O'Clock Is Rosary", 1992
 Sarah 069 Brighter, "Disney", 1992
 Sarah 070 Blueboy, "Cloud Babies", 1993, with 3 mini-fanzines: 
 "just as good as I should be"
 "nice boys prefer vanilla"
 "i am telling you because you are far away"
 Sarah 071 Secret Shine, "Loveblind", 1993
 Sarah 072 The Sugargliders, "Ahprahran", 1993
 Sarah 073 Action Painting!, "Classical Music", 1993
 Sarah 074 Blueboy, "Meet Johnny Rave", 1993
 Sarah 075 East River Pipe, "Helmet On", 1993
 Sarah 076 Boyracer, "B Is For Boyracer", 1993
 Sarah 077 The Sugargliders, "Trumpet Play", 1993
 Sarah 078 East River Pipe, "She's A Real Good Time", 1993
 Sarah 079 Even As We Speak, "Blue Eyes Deceiving Me", 1993
 Sarah 080 Blueboy, "Some Gorgeous Accident", 1993
 Sarah 081 Heavenly, "P.U.N.K. Girl", 1993
 Sarah 082 Heavenly, "Atta Girl", 1993
 Sarah 083 The Sugargliders, "Will We Ever Learn", 1993
 Sarah 084 Harvest Ministers, "If It Kills Me And It Will", 1993
 Sarah 085 Boyracer, "From Purity To Purgatory", 1993
 Sarah 086 The Sugargliders, "Top 40 Sculpture", 1993
 Sarah 087 Action Painting!, "Mustard Gas", 1993
 Sarah 088 Blueboy, "River", 1994
 Sarah 089 Secret Shine, "Greater Than God", 1994
 Sarah 090 The Hit Parade, "Autobiography", 1994
 Sarah 091 Ivy, "Wish You Would", 1994
 Sarah 092 Ivy, "Avenge", 1994
 Sarah 093 Aberdeen, "Byron", 1994
 Sarah 094 Northern Picture Library, "Paris", 1994
 Sarah 095 Northern Picture Library, "Last September's Farewell Kiss", 1994
 Sarah 096 Boyracer, "Pure Hatred '96", 1994
 Sarah 097 Aberdeen, "Fireworks", 1994
 Sarah 098 Shelley, "Reproduction Is Pollution", 1995
 Sarah 099 Blueboy, "Dirty Mags", 1995

Albums
10" (all + CD except Lyceum, Snowball, Bacharach)
 Sarah 401 The Orchids, Lyceum, 1989
 Sarah 402 The Field Mice, Snowball, 1989
 Sarah 403 St. Christopher, Bacharach, 1990
 Sarah 404 Brighter, Laurel, 1991
 Sarah 405 East River Pipe, Goodbye California, 1993
 Sarah 406 Harvey Williams, Rebellion, 1995
 Sarah 407 East River Pipe, Even The Sun Was Afraid, 1995

12" (all + CD except Skywriting, They've Scoffed The Lot)
 Sarah 601 The Field Mice, Skywriting, 1990
 Sarah 602 The Wake, Make It Loud, 1990
 Sarah 603 Heavenly, Heavenly Vs. Satan, 1991
 Sarah 604 Talulah Gosh!, They've Scoffed the Lot, 1991
 Sarah 605 The Orchids, Unholy Soul, 1991
 Sarah 606 The Field Mice, Coastal, 1991
 Sarah 607 The Field Mice, For Keeps, 1991
 Sarah 608 The Sweetest Ache, Jaguar , 1992
 Sarah 609 The Sea Urchins, Stardust, 1992
 Sarah 610 Heavenly, Le Jardin de Heavenly, 1992
 Sarah 611 The Orchids, Epicurean, 1992
 Sarah 612 Blueboy, If Wishes Were Horses, 1992
 Sarah 613 Another Sunny Day, London Weekend, 1992
 Sarah 614 Even As We Speak, Feral Pop Frenzy, 1993
 Sarah 615 Secret Shine, Untouched, 1993
 Sarah 616 Harvest Ministers, Little Dark Mansion, 1993
 Sarah 617 The Orchids, Striving For The Lazy Perfection, 1994
 Sarah 618 The Wake, Tidal Wave of Hype, 1994
 Sarah 619 The Sugargliders, We're All Trying To Get There, 1994
 Sarah 620 Blueboy, Unisex, 1994
 Sarah 621 East River Pipe, Poor Fricky, 1994
 Sarah 622 The Hit Parade, The Sound Of The Hit Parade, 1994
 Sarah 623 Heavenly, The Decline and Fall of Heavenly, 1994

Compilations
(in chronological order)
 Sarah 587 Shadow Factory, 1988
 Sarah 376 Temple Cloud, 1990
 Sarah 545 Air Balloon Road, 1990
 Sarah 501 Glass Arcade, 1991
 Sarah 583 Fountain Island, 1992
 Sarah 628 Engine Common, 1993
 Sarah 530 Gaol Ferry Bridge, 1994
 Sarah 359 Battery Point, 1995
 Sarah 100 There And Back Again Lane, 1995

See also 
 Sarah Records

External links
 Unofficial Sarah Records website

Discographies of British record labels
Discography